Wojnówko  is a settlement in the administrative district of Gmina Murowana Goślina, within Poznań County, Greater Poland Voivodeship, in west-central Poland. It lies on the banks of a small lake, Lake Łomno, and close to forest areas.

The settlement consists largely of a complex of vacation properties. It has a small permanent population of about 26. It belongs to the sołectwo of Wojnowo. (The name Wojnówko is a diminutive of Wojnowo.)

Notes

References
Murowana Goślina i okolice, N. Kulse, Z. Wojczak (local publication)

Villages in Poznań County